This is a list of bus routes in Winnipeg, Manitoba, Canada.

Winnipeg Transit provides public bus service to the city of Winnipeg, operating 88 bus routes . Many routes on this list have more than one ultimate destination, even on trips travelling in the same direction. For instance, the Route 16 Osborne (southbound) has five ultimate destinations; all trips travel down Osborne Street as far as Kingston Row, but beyond that point they diverge depending on signage.

All routes are wheelchair accessible.

Route types 
Winnipeg Transit classifies it's 88 bus routes into the following eight categories:

Bus routes

References

External links
Winnipeg Transport - list of all routes

Winnipeg Transit
Winnipeg
Municipal government of Winnipeg
Bus routes
Transport in Winnipeg